The Flowers of War (Pinyin: Jīnlíng Shísān Chāi ) is a 2011 Chinese-Hong Kong historical drama war film directed by Zhang Yimou, starring Christian Bale, Ni Ni, Zhang Xinyi, Tong Dawei, Atsuro Watabe, Shigeo Kobayashi and Cao Kefan. The film is based on a novella by Geling Yan, 13 Flowers of Nanjing, inspired by the diary of Minnie Vautrin. The story is set in Nanking, China, during the 1937 Nanking Massacre in the Second Sino-Japanese War. A group of escapees, finding sanctuary in a church compound, try to survive the Japanese atrocities.

It was selected as the Chinese entry for Best Foreign Language Film at the 84th Academy Awards, but did not make the final shortlist. It also received a nomination for the 69th Golden Globe Awards. The 6th Asian Film Awards presented The Flowers of War with several individual nominations, including Best Film. The film's North American distribution rights were acquired by Wrekin Hill Entertainment, in association with Row 1 Productions, leading to an Oscar-qualifying limited release in New York, Los Angeles and San Francisco in late December 2011, with general release in January 2012.

The Flowers of War received mixed reviews from critics and was a box office bomb, grossing only $98 million against a $94 million budget.

Plot
In 1937, Japan invades China, beginning the Second Sino-Japanese War. The Imperial Japanese Army overruns China's capital city, Nanking, in December and carries out the Nanking massacre. As the Japanese overrun the Chinese army, desperate schoolgirls flee to the sanctuary of their convent at a Western-run Roman Catholic cathedral. John Miller, an American mortician on a job to bury the head priest, joins the group of innocent schoolgirls.  He finds George, an orphan boy who was raised by the dead priest and taught English. Soon a group of flamboyant prostitutes arrive at the cathedral, seeking refuge by hiding in the cellar. Pretending to be a priest, Miller tries to keep everyone safe while repairing the convent's truck to escape.

After an incident when rogue Japanese forces assault the cathedral (who are then killed by the dying effort of a lone Chinese Major), Japanese Colonel Hasegawa promises to protect the convent by placing guards outside the gate and requests that the schoolgirls sing a chorale for him. Several days later, he hands Miller an official invitation for the schoolgirls to sing at the Japanese Army's victory celebration. Fearing for the safety of the virginal schoolgirls, Miller declines. Hasegawa informs him that it is an order and that the girls are going to be picked up the next day. Before they leave, the Japanese soldiers count the schoolgirls and erroneously include one of the prostitutes (who has strayed from the cellar), totalling 13.

When the de facto leader of the schoolgirls, Shu Juan, convinces them that they are better off committing suicide by jumping off the cathedral tower, they are saved at the last moment when the de facto leader of the prostitutes, Yu Mo, convinces her group to protect the schoolgirls by taking their place at the Japanese party. As there are only 12 prostitutes, George, the dead priest's adoptive son, volunteers as well. Miller initially opposes their self-sacrificial decision but relents and assists in disguising them, using his skills as a mortician to adjust their makeup and cut their hair to appear like schoolgirls. The prostitutes also create knives out of broken windows and hide them in their cloaks.

The next day, the "13 Flowers of Nanking" are led away by the unsuspecting Japanese soldiers. After they depart, Miller hides the schoolgirls on the truck he repaired and using a single-person permit provided by the father of a schoolgirl, drives out of Nanking. In the last scene, the truck is seen driving on a deserted highway heading west, away from the Japanese army. The fate of the 13 Flowers remains unknown, apparently martyring themselves for the schoolgirls' freedom.

Cast

 Christian Bale as John Miller
 Ni Ni as Yu Mo
 Zhang Xinyi as Shu
 Tong Dawei as Major Li
 Atsuro Watabe as Colonel Hasegawa
 Shigeo Kobayashi as Lieutenant Kato
 Cao Kefan as Mr. Meng
 Huang Tianyuan as George Chen
 Han Xiting as Yi
 Zhang Doudou as Ling
 Yuan Yangchunzi as Mosquito
 Sun Jia as Hua
 Li Yuemin as Dou
 Bai Xue as Lan
 Takashi Yamanaka as Lieutenant Asakura
 Hirofumi Yasunaga as Japanese Soldier
 Paul Schneider as Terry

Production
In December 2010, it was announced that the film would be made, and pre-production started the same month. They began shooting on location in Nanjing, China, on January 10, 2011. The dialogue of the film was shot about 40% in English and the rest in Mandarin Chinese (particularly in the Nanjing dialect, distinct from Standard Chinese) and Japanese, with an estimated production budget of $94 million, which makes it the most expensive film in Chinese history.

To distinguish the film from previous depictions of the same subject, Zhang said that he tried to portray the Japanese invaders with multiple layers. Regarding Colonel Hasegawa's sympathetic features, he explained that "in 1937, the militaristic notion among Japanese armies was very prevalent, and officers were not allowed to sing a homesick folk song, but we still wanted to endow this character with something special." The director articulated that his biggest, though challenging, accomplishment in the film was the creation of John Miller, saying that "this kind of character, a foreigner, a drifter, a thug almost, becomes a hero and saves the lives of Chinese people. That has never ever happened in Chinese filmmaking, and I think it will never happen again in the future." Filming completed within 6 months. One challenging aspect was what Zhang called the "very slow pace" of negotiation with the Chinese censorship authorities during the editing process.

Marketing
On September 9, 2011, the film was retitled The Flowers of War, after a 20-minute screening for prominent U.S. film distributors and the media at the Toronto International Film Festival.  Zhang stated that the story in The Flowers of War differs from many other Chinese films on this subject as it is told from the perspectives of women. In October 2011, the first trailer was released, making way for an American trailer to be revealed.

Release
On November 22, 2011, New Pictures Film requested an inflation in the minimum ticket price within China. When in negotiations with the eight cinema circuits in question, it resulted in a threat to boycott the movie over the distributors' share. Wu Hehu, the general manager of Shanghai United Cinema Circuit, made a statement, saying “this is a simple business situation. Without the agreement, we cannot screen the film." Zhang Weiping, producer of The Flowers of War and head of New Pictures Film, also refused to make any concessions. A letter was sent to the Film Bureau of SARFT, hoping it would mediate the dispute. At the order of SARFT, both sides were to reach a compromise, which was achieved after four hours of negotiation.

Box office
The film grossed US$98,227,017 worldwide, including  in China, US$1,331,369 in Hong Kong, and $311,434 in the United States and Canada.

China
The Flowers of War was released in China just days after the 74th anniversary of the Nanking Massacre. In its first four days of release, it took in $24 million at the box office. It was the top-grossing Chinese film of 2011, having earned $70 million after two weeks. After 17 days, the movie had grossed nearly $83 million, making it the sixth-highest-grossing film in China, following American exports such as Transformers: Revenge of the Fallen ($145.5 million) and Avatar ($204 million). After five weeks of release the movie earned $93 million. The film reportedly earned $95 million in China.

Critical reaction
The movie received mixed reviews. Rotten Tomatoes reported a 41% critical approval rating based on 58 reviews, with an average of 5.53/10. The site's consensus reads, "Zhang Yimou's stylistic flair is in full bloom during The Flowers of War, but his colorful treatment of a historical genocide ultimately does a disservice to the horrifying events' inherent drama." Metacritic, another review aggregator, assigned the film an average score of 46 (out of 100) based on 22 reviews from mainstream critics, indicating "mixed or average reviews.

Twitch Film called it "arguably the most eagerly-anticipated Chinese movie of the year", saying that "The Flowers of War is a big movie in every sense of the word, from its kinetic battle scenes to the beautiful photography and impressive performances from a mostly young and inexperienced cast." Pete Hammond from Boxoffice Magazine gave it 4 stars out of 5, and said "The Flowers of War is ultimately an inspiring, stirring and unforgettable human drama in the face of a horrifying war. It is highly recommended." Variety gave a generally positive review, describing the film as "a uniquely harrowing account of the rape of Nanjing," and defined it as "a work of often garish dramatic flourishes yet undeniable emotional power, finding humor and heartbreak in a tale of unlikely heroism in close quarters." Andrew Pulver describes it as "a new dawn in China-Hollywood co-operation", arguing that "this ambitious war film from Zhang Yimou is an attempt to turn the revolting aftermath of the 1937 Japanese assault on Nanjing into a globally friendly, putatively inspiring epic that also aims to underscore the US and China's geopolitical mutual respect."

Most negative feedback from critics were similar to that from Toronto Star, which gave the film 2.5/4, and said that "the drama is often weakened by the penchant for creating spectacles." Roger Ebert, who gave the film 2 out of 4 stars, took issue with making the story about a white American, "Can you think of any reason the character John Miller is needed to tell his story? Was any consideration given to the possibility of a Chinese priest? Would that be asking for too much?"

Accolades

Home media
The Flowers of War was released on Blu-ray Disc and DVD on June 10, 2012. In the United States, the DVD and Blu-ray releases grossed $2,418,217 in physical sales. In the United Kingdom, it was 2012's seventh best-selling foreign-language film on physical home video formats, and the year's second best-selling Asian-language film (below The Raid).

See also

 List of submissions to the 84th Academy Awards for Best Foreign Language Film
 List of Chinese submissions for the Academy Award for Best Foreign Language Film
 Golden Globe Award for Best Foreign Language Film

References

External links

 
 
 
 

2011 romantic drama films
2011 films
Chinese war drama films
Chinese romantic drama films
Nanjing Massacre films
Films directed by Zhang Yimou
2010s Japanese-language films
2010s Mandarin-language films
English-language Chinese films
English-language Hong Kong films
Films about interracial romance
War romance films
Films based on Chinese novels
Films with screenplays by Liu Heng
Second Sino-Japanese War films
2011 war drama films
Hong Kong war drama films
Hong Kong romantic drama films
2010s English-language films
2011 multilingual films
Chinese multilingual films
Hong Kong multilingual films
2010s Hong Kong films